SR (short for Synchronizing Resources) is a programming language designed for concurrent programming.

Resources encapsulate processes and the variables they share, and can be separately compiled. Operations provide the primary mechanism for process interaction.

SR provides a novel integration of the mechanisms for invoking and servicing operations. Consequently, it supports local and remote procedure call, rendezvous, message passing, dynamic process creation, multicast, semaphores and shared memory.

Version 2.2 has been ported to the Apollo, DECstation, Data General AViiON, HP 9000 Series 300, Multimax, NeXT, PA-RISC, RS/6000, Sequent Symmetry, SGI IRIS, Sun-3, Sun-4 and others.

See also
 Occam
 MPD

References
Gregory R. Andrews, Ronald A. Olsson: The SR Programming Language: Concurrency in Practice, 
Stephen J. Hartley: Operating Systems Programming: The SR Programming Language, Oxford University Press,

External links
 The SR Programming Language

Concurrent programming languages